Heinz Plank, born 13 October 1945 in Bad Elster, Vogtlandkreis, Saxony, is a German painter, draughtsman and graphic artist. He studied under Wolfgang Mattheuer and Werner Tübke at the Hochschule für Grafik und Buchkunst Leipzig from 1967 to 1972. He is associated with the middle generation of the Leipzig School. His paintings use a mixture of traditional elements and modern abstraction. They have a recurring sense of bitterness and apocalypse.

References

External links
 
 Website of the artist: heinz-plank.de/en/

1945 births
Living people
People from Bad Elster
20th-century German painters
20th-century German male artists
21st-century German painters
21st-century German male artists
German contemporary artists
German draughtsmen
German graphic designers
German male painters
Hochschule für Grafik und Buchkunst Leipzig alumni